Aulsondro "Novelist" Hamilton, better known by his stage name Emcee N.I.C.E., is an American Christian hip hop recording artist, musician and author. He was born in Los Angeles, California and is of Puerto Rican descent, but was raised in El Paso, Texas and Topeka, Kansas.

He has served as a producer, writer and recording artist, working with artists such as 2 Pac, Nas, A Lighter Shade of Brown, Aaron Hall, K-Ci Hailey, Doctor Fink, Al B. Sure, Melissa Molinaro, MC Lyte and Fred Hammond. He is currently starring in Da Jammies as "Novelist" that started on Netflix now on Amazon Prime, Roku, Xfinity, Apple TV, Cox. This includes an association with the Academy Award-winning film Crash, appearing on its soundtrack as a lead vocalist/rapper of KansasCali. Their music video was included on the DVD's special features section, narrated by Paul Haggis. Five No. 1 hit records on the Billboard charts in "I Got Angels" claiming two positions along with "Glory to God" (ft. Fred Hammond) & Nielsen BDS including a No. 1 gospel album in Praise.

Emcee N.I.C.E. would also go on to appear on four more soundtracks, along with multiple guest features and theme songs for television shows. He is also a member of one of Los Angeles's elite rap coalitions, The Massmen, put together by industry veterans Dejon Jack H. Clark, producer DJ Fat Jack and founders Patrick "Minister 2 Bad" Parker & David "Twice D" Tarver. The group is currently led by LA hip-hop legend Abstract Rude, and its members also includes Awol One, Mista Grimm.

History
Discovered by De’Jon J.H. Clark and DJ Fat Jack, novelist, aka Emcee N.I.C.E., had early success in 2002 with a co-production of Thugz Mansion that landed him on both the triple platinum album Better Dayz of iconic rapper 2 Pac, and platinum album God's Son of hip hop legend Nas.

N.I.C.E. then co-founded a Las Vegas-based duo called KansasCali, an R&B hip hop group that would later evolve into an urban pop rock band called The Rocturnals. In 2002 the duo released an independent record called Vegas One (The Beginning) and in 2003 landed the theme song for the NFL all-time leading rusher Emmitt Smith’s TV show The Emmitt Zone.

It wasn't until 2004 when the duo converted into an urban pop rock group that they would achieved real success, landing on the Oscar-winning film Crash soundtrack and music video for song "If I..." prominently featured in the "Special Features" of the DVD that went on to sell well over 10 million units. That same year, they also landed on the international soundtrack of the blockbuster film Mr. & Mrs. Smith, starring Brad Pitt and Angelina Jolie. The duo was also chosen by Billboard Magazine Executive Tamara Coniff to open and perform at the First Annual Billboard Digital Entertainment Awards.

The success kept rolling, as the duo teamed up with Shay Todd and co-founder Shiro Gutzie of the Superb Group, to release the duo's EP Hello World in 2005. That same year the duo also made guest appearances on R&B Legend Aaron Hall’s final album Adults Only, featured on the song "Serve That Body".

In 2005, Novelist co-founded urban animation company Toon Farm Animation. This led to the creation of the Urban Family animated music cartoon called Da Jammies, which he starred in as the character Novelist along with other notable actors such as Darius McCrary, Kyla Pratt, Kel Mitchell, Tiny Lister, Kim Whitley, James Avery, Alisa Reyes, Kurtis Blow, YoYo, and Lil' JJ.

In 2006 N.I.C.E.'s group, as KansasCali was featured on more soundtracks, ESPN’s movie soundtrack Once in a Lifetime: The Extraordinary Story of the New York Cosmos (with their song "U Gotta Fight!" which prominently features Novelist), and Orlando Bloom’s Haven soundtrack (with the song "Uuuh").

That same year the duo made a guest appearance on an album by R&B legend K-Ci Hailey of K-Ci & JoJo, with both production and features on his album entitled My Book with songs "It's All Love" feat. KansasCali, and production on the song "Soldier". In 2007 KansasCali produced and featured on another TV special, George Wilborn's TVOne comedy special I Don't Want to Be No Star in 2008, Jamie Kennedy’s Kicking It Old Skool with song "The Life" as the closing credits Lil JJ's Almost Grown, and finally in 2009 on Lav Luv's TVOne comedy special I'm Gonna Get in Trouble. KansasCali then went independent and became an urban rock band, changing their names to The Rocturnals.

From 2008 to 2012 Emcee N.I.C.E. as Novelist with The Rocturnals would go on to make six more records. He also landed yet another song that debuted on TV, this time teaming up with Mark Cuban on an NBA theme song "This is Where Amazing Happens", debuting at the NBA All-Star Rookie Challenge in Dallas on TNT. The Rocturnals released an independent LP The Life, an earth song, "Celebrate the Earth", then were featured on Prince & The Revolution co-founder Doctor Fink’s compilation record Doctor Fink Presents a Tribute to Prince with their classic remake of "Pop Life".

In June 2012 Emcee N.I.C.E. released a single entitled "Life of the Party" that featured newcomer Blake "Jus Blake" Smith. The single gained notoriety fast when the "Dance Version" produced by hit maker Ralph "Phantom" Stacy (who also produced Dru Hill, SWV, Johnny Gill, and Houston) was released featuring iconic and controversial actress Stacey Dash and "Jus Blake". Russell Simmons' Global Grind jumped behind it first, followed by Yahoo Music and TooFab. The music video was leaked by TMZ and its subsidiary TooFab, but suffered a blow when Stacey Dash announced her support for presidential candidate Mitt Romney, much to the chagrin of the African American community. Any momentum the record had was lost. Emcee N.I.C.E. tried to pick the momentum back up in December with a Christmas release, "Christmas With U" feat. Who Am I?, donating a portion of the proceeds to anti-bullying and anti-hazing campaigns.

As an actor in 2015, Emcee N.I.C.E. under his real name Aulsondro "Novelist" Hamilton made his debut. Starring as the character "Novelist" in the 3D animated music series entitled Da Jammies now on Netflix Executive Produced by Ralph Farquhar (Real Husbands of Hollywood, Moesha, The Parkers, Wendy Wu, etc...) in which he also serves as Co-Executive Producer. In the same year, Emcee N.I.C.E. made an appearance as Superman in the TV show 6 Degrees of Everything by the Fine Brothers on TruTV

Productions, Releases and Guest Appearances
Albums | Singles | EP's

As a writer and performer A Lighter Shade of Brown

1994 to 1999

Charts (1994–1999) 
Peak positions

Albums

As a member and lead vocalist/rapper of KansasCali

2002 to 2006

Charts (2002–2008)

Peak positions

As Emcee N.I.C.E. (Novelist Is Constantly Evolving)

2012

2013

2015 

Tonight feat. Suhana Machete peaked at No. 8 on the US Billboard Hot Single Sales Chart in 2014 (Billboard Albums)

2016

2017

2018

2019

2020

2021 
{| class="wikitable"
|-
! Artist !! Album !! Label !! Released !! Singles !! Contribution !! Production
|-
| PTtheGOSPELSPITTER || S.f.T.K.|| Serving The Peace || 1/2021 || "S.f.T.K."(feat. Emcee N.I.C.E.)|| Writer & Performer || none
|-
| DJ Penny || Testify|| DJ Penny || 1/2021 || "Testify" (feat. Sammy Sas, Lekan Salamii, Lil Zig & Emcee N.I.C.E)(Remix)|| Writer & Performer || none
|-
| Harmini || Rise Up|| Harmini || 3/2021 || "Rise Up"(feat. Emcee N.I.C.E.)|| Writer & Performer || none
|-
| RYZE Magazine Presents || This Is TBL|| RYZE Magazine Records || 4/2021 || "This Is TBL" (feat. Lamontt Blackshire, Emcee N.I.C.E. & DaLomonze)|| Writer & Performer || none
|-
| Emcee N.I.C.E. || ''Dancin|| Gypsy City Music || 4/2021 || "Dancin'" (feat. DaLomonze)|| Writer & Performer || none
|-
| Travis August || Chachos|| Travis August || 6/2021 || "Chachos" (feat. Emcee N.I.C.E.)|| Writer & Performer || none
|-
| Bryann Trejo || Precious Stones|| Kingdom Music Records || 6/2021 || "Precious Stones"[Remix](feat. Moe Grant & Emcee N.I.C.E.)|| Writer & Performer || none
|}

 2022 

 2020-EP's 

 Charts (2014–2021) 
 13 Weeks on the Billboard Hot Single Sales chart 

 as a CHH Artist 

 Music Videos 
A music video for "Thugz Mansion" was shot. The video was nominated at the 2003 MTV Video Music Awards for Best Rap Video.

other music videos includes:
"If U Wanna Groove" with Lighter Shade of Brown
"If I..." with KansasCali
"The Life" with KansasCali
"Life of The Party" with Stacey Dash & Blake Smith
"I Got Angels" 
"This Is TBL" with Lamontt Blackshire & DaLomonze 
"Precious Stones" with Bryann Trejo

Motion Picture Soundtracks

As a member and lead vocalist/rapper of The Rocturnals
2008 (soundtrack)

2009 – 2011

Acting
Movies

Television

TV shows and special songs

Awards and achievements

Stellar Gospel Music Awards

|-
| rowspan="2" | 2019 || rowspan="6" | Emcee N.I.C.E. (God's House of Hip Hop Radio on Dash Radio) || Gospel Hip Hop Station of the Year || 
|-
| Rap Hip-Hop Gospel CD of the Year || 
|-
|}

|-
| rowspan="2" | 2020 || rowspan="6" | Emcee N.I.C.E. (God's House of Hip Hop Radio on Dash Radio) || Internet Station of the Year || 
|-
|}

|-
| rowspan="2" | 2021 || rowspan="6" | Emcee N.I.C.E. (God's House of Hip Hop Radio on Dash Radio) || Internet Station of the Year || 
|-
|}

The Spin Awards

|-
|rowspan="2" | 2019
| Emcee N.I.C.E.
| Voice of the Year
| 
|-
| Emcee N.I.C.E.
| Internet Radio Personality of the Year
| 
|-
|-
|rowspan="4" | 2019
| Emcee N.I.C.E.
| Internet Radio Host of the Year
| 
|-
| Emcee N.I.C.E.
| Best Radio Show 2 or More – (God's Calamari w/ Emcee N.I.C.E. & The God Squad)
| 
|-
| "God's House of Hip Hop Radio on Dash Radio" Curated by Emcee N.I.C.E.
| Best New Station of the Year
| 
|-
| "God's House of Hip Hop Radio on Dash Radio" Curated by Emcee N.I.C.E.
| Internet Radio Station of the Year
| 
|}

|-
|rowspan="3" | 2020
| Emcee N.I.C.E.
| Voice of the Year
| 
|-
| Emcee N.I.C.E. & The God Squad
| Best Radio Show
| 
|-
| God's House of Hip Hop powered by Dash Radio Curated by Emcee N.I.C.E.
| Best Radio Station
| 
|}

|-
|rowspan="3" | 2021
| Emcee N.I.C.E.
| STATION MANAGER/PROGRAM DIRECTOR OF THE YEAR
|  
|-
| God's House of Hip Hop powered by Dash Radio Curated by Emcee N.I.C.E.
| RADIO STATION OF THE YEAR
| 
|}

The Gospel Hip Hop Awards

|-
| rowspan="6" | 2021 || rowspan="6" | Emcee N.I.C.E. || Living Legend Recipient || 
|-
|}

|-
| rowspan="6" | 2022 || rowspan="6" | Emcee N.I.C.E. || Male Urban Artist of the Year || 
|-
| Best Gospel Hip Hop Song || 
|-
| Best Gospel Hip Hop Collaboration || 
|-
| Best Male Latino || 
|-
| Best Gospel Latino Collaboration || 
|-
| Best Gospel Hip Hop Radio Show || 
|}

The complete list of winners can be found here https://www.thegospelhiphopawards.com/team-4

Kingdom Image Awards

|-
| rowspan="2" | 2019 || rowspan="6" | Emcee N.I.C.E. || Hip Hop Artist of the Year || 
|-
| Producer of the Year – (Sam Peezy) || 
|}Awards/Nominations 2019: Stellar Awards Nomination, Rap/Hip Hop CD of the Year – PRAISE
 2019: Stellar Awards Nomination, Internet Station of the Year – GH3 Radio (God's House of Hip Hop) – Curated by Emcee N.I.C.E.
 2019: Kingdom Image Awards Nomination, Producer of the Year –
 2019: The Spin Awards Nominees

Books
 50 Shades of L.O.V.E. – (Learning Our Various Emotions) (July 15, 2015)
 Music Release University - The Indies' Guide to Releasing Music! (August 19, 2022)Note:''' (Music Release University - The Indies' Guide to Releasing Music! is an Amazon Books New Release Best Seller achieving No. 1 in the category of "Music Recording & Sound" and a Top 10 Best Seller in the category of "Music Business")

References

External links

Midwest hip hop musicians
Puerto Rican hip hop musicians
West Coast hip hop musicians
Musicians from Topeka, Kansas
Musicians from El Paso, Texas
Singers from Kansas
Musicians from Los Angeles
20th-century American male actors
20th-century American poets
20th-century American singers
African-American male rappers
African-American non-fiction writers
African-American poets
American male poets
American male television actors
Hispanic and Latino American rappers
Puerto Rican rappers
Mercury Records artists
Living people
Year of birth missing (living people)
20th-century American male writers
20th-century American non-fiction writers
American male non-fiction writers
21st-century American rappers
20th-century American male singers
21st-century American male musicians
American performers of Christian hip hop music
20th-century African-American writers
21st-century African-American musicians
African-American male writers